March on Electric Children is the second studio album by the American post-hardcore band The Blood Brothers, released in February 2002. Produced by Matt Bayles, the album (which is described in the liner notes as a "short story set to music") was recorded in one week on a $3000 budget and has been described by singer Jordan Blilie as "crazier" and "more complex" than the band's previous effort, This Adultery Is Ripe.

Concept album
The album has been described by numerous critics as a concept album, with its characters portrayed more as villains and victims than as heroes. The effort was an attempt by the band to create a storyline with repeating characters that has a bleak outlook on life, emphasizing the consequences of the characters' selfish choices. A common motif utilized throughout the album is the ocean and sea creatures, which was a result of vocalist Johnny Whitney taking an oceanography class during the album's production. The album marks additions to the band's songwriting tools. For example, "Kiss of the Octopus" samples "The Perfect Drug" by Nine Inch Nails, and the piano acts as the sole instrument played on "American Vultures". It is also the conclusion to the storyline and wraps up the themes featured in the previous songs. Says singer Jordan Blilie:

Characters
 Mr. Electric Ocean - "the personification of the media and exploitation and superficiality... the person that influences the protagonist during the entire record"
 The Skin Army - "a representation of our culture as completely superficial and concerned with the exterior, skin, and what is on the outside"

Track listing

Personnel
The Blood Brothers
Jordan Blilie - vocals
Mark Gajadhar - drums
Morgan Henderson - bass, sampler, M1
Cody Votolato - guitar
Johnny Whitney - vocals, piano

Production and design
Matt Bayles - producer, engineer, mixer
The Blood Brothers - co-producer
Troy T - assistant engineer
Ed B - mastering
Dan Dean - layout concept, design, photographs, art
Morgan Henderson - layout concept, design, photographs, art
Jeffrey Degolier - photographs, art

Release history

References

The Blood Brothers (band) albums
2002 albums
Albums produced by Matt Bayles